Pey may refer to:

People
 José Miguel Pey de Andrade (1763–1838), Colombian statesman
 Pey de Garros (1530–1585), Occitan poet
 Víctor Pey (1915–2018), Spanish engineer, professor, and businessman

Places
 Pey, Landes, Nouvelle-Aquitaine, France
 Pey, Netherlands, in Echt-Susteren municipality, Netherlands
 Penong Airport, Australia

Other
 Pey or Pe (Semitic letter)
 Petjo language, by ISO 639

See also
 Pay (disambiguation)